Jason James Kubel (born May 25, 1982) is an American former professional baseball player. He played in Major League Baseball (MLB) for the Minnesota Twins,  Arizona Diamondbacks, and Cleveland Indians.

A Belle Fourche, South Dakota native, Kubel was drafted by the Twins in the 12th round of the 2000 MLB draft after playing at Highland High School.

Early life
Jason Kubel was born May 25, 1982 in Belle Fourche, South Dakota to Myron and Debbie Kubel. His family moved to Palmdale California, where he played baseball at Highland High School in Palmdale, California. Kubel had a .491 batting average during his sophomore and junior years at Highland. He was ranked the number 50 high school prospect by Baseball America. Kubel signed a letter of intent to play college baseball for the Long Beach State Dirtbags.

Professional career

Minor leagues
In  Kubel played outfield in the Twins' minor league system, starting out with the AA New Britain Rock Cats, where Kubel batted .377 in 37 games before being promoted to the Twins' AAA affiliate, the Rochester Red Wings. His impressive play landed him a place in the 2004 All-Star Futures Game.  Kubel's play impressed manager Ron Gardenhire enough to warrant a call-up to the majors for the Twins' American League Central Division championship run in September. Kubel played well over the course of 23 games, batting .300 over 67 plate appearances.

Kubel suffered a serious knee injury in the Arizona Fall League later that year, which caused him to miss the entire  season.

Minnesota Twins

Kubel returned to action in spring training , made the Twins' opening day roster, and started in right field on Opening Day. However, he got off to a slow start at the plate and was optioned to Triple-A Rochester on April 16, 2006. Kubel returned to the Twins lineup on May 23, 2006, as a replacement for the injured Shannon Stewart. He hit well in his return, including a walk-off grand slam against the Boston Red Sox in the 12th inning at the Hubert H. Humphrey Metrodome on June 13, 2006. After that, continued soreness in his knees limited his playing time and success for the rest of the 2006 season.

Kubel's  statistics showed improvement, playing 128 games with 418 at-bats. On July 6, 2007, Kubel drove in a career high seven runs in a 20-14 victory over the Chicago White Sox.

During the  season, Kubel primarily served as the designated hitter slot due to the acquisition of left fielder Delmon Young from the Tampa Bay Rays. Kubel hit well in the clutch and provided much needed power in the middle of the Twins' lineup.

The 2009 season proved to be Kubel's most productive. On April 17, Kubel hit for the cycle against the Los Angeles Angels in the Metrodome. After a double in the 1st inning, single in the 3rd, triple in the 6th, and strikeout in the 7th, Kubel capped the Twins' 7-run 8th inning with an upper deck grand slam to right-center field, which would prove decisive in the Twins' 11-9 victory. Kubel finished the game 4 for 5 with 2 runs scored and 5 RBI. On June 4, Kubel hit two three-run home runs in an 11-3 win over the Cleveland Indians and hit another pair of three-run home runs to help defeat the Kansas City Royals on October 4. Kubel finished the season with career highs in batting average (.300), runs batted in (103), total bases (277), and OPS (.907). For his efforts, Kubel would be honored with a 24th-place finish in AL MVP voting that year.

The 2010 Minnesota Twins increasingly called on Kubel to play in the field, due to a number of roster changes and injuries. Following the trade that sent center fielder Carlos Gómez to the Brewers for all-star shortstop J. J. Hardy, and the off-season acquisition of veteran slugger Jim Thome to fill the designated hitter position, Kubel found himself being used as a utility player and pinch hitter. However, due to the defensive shifting resulting from Justin Morneau's ongoing health issues, Kubel settled in as the Twins' right fielder, platooning with Michael Cuddyer. On April 12, Kubel hit the first home run in a regular-season game at Target Field, helping the Twins christen their new stadium in a 5-2 victory over the Boston Red Sox. On May 16, Kubel hit a grand slam off legendary closer Mariano Rivera to help the Twins beat the Yankees. It was only the fourth grand slam that Rivera had surrendered in his career.

Kubel started out the 2011 season hitting extremely well by peaking his batting average at .354 in May. This brought on speculation the Twins may try to trade Kubel to make room in an otherwise crowded team outfield. Due to injuries by fellow outfielders Delmon Young, Denard Span, and call-up Jason Repko, Kubel's position was critical to the Twins before finally getting hurt himself  and missing all of the month of June.

Arizona Diamondbacks
On December 19, 2011, Kubel signed a two-year, $15 million deal with an option for a third year with the Arizona Diamondbacks. For the 2012 season, Kubel served as the designated hitter during interleague play at American League ballparks.

The Diamondbacks designated Kubel for assignment on August 27, 2013.

Cleveland Indians
The Diamondbacks traded Kubel to the Cleveland Indians for a player to be named later on August 30, 2013.

The Indians declined their club option on Kubel's contract for the 2014 season on November 1, 2013, making Kubel a free agent.

Second stint with Twins
Kubel signed a minor league deal to return to the Twins on December 13, 2013. Kubel was designated for assignment on June 8, 2014, and released on June 16.  Kubel ended his 2014 season with a .224 batting average, one home run, 13 RBI, and 59 strikeouts in 176 plate appearances.

Personal life
Kubel is the brother-in-law of Michael Tonkin. They briefly played together for the Twins in 2014.

At the conclusion of his career as a professional baseball player, Kubel became a Little League coach.

See also

 List of Major League Baseball players to hit for the cycle

References

External links

1982 births
Living people
Major League Baseball designated hitters
Major League Baseball left fielders
Baseball players from South Dakota
Minnesota Twins players
Arizona Diamondbacks players
Cleveland Indians players
Gulf Coast Twins players
Quad Cities River Bandits players
Fort Myers Miracle players
New Britain Rock Cats players
Rochester Red Wings players
People from Belle Fourche, South Dakota
People from Palmdale, California